Chani or Chañi may also refer to:

People
 Hassan Chani (born 1988), Bahraini long-distance runner  
 Chani Getter, American counselor
 Chani Nicholas (born 1975), Canadian astrologer
 Kang Chan-hee (born 2000), South Korean singer nicknamed Chani

Other
 Chani (character), a fictional character from Frank Herbert's 1965 science fiction novel Dune
 Eumunida chani, a species of squat lobster
 Nevado de Chañi, an Argentinian mountain in the Andes
 Phobaeticus chani, a species of stick insect

See also
 Chania (disambiguation)
 Chanie, a village in Podlaskie Voivodeship, Poland